Arctotheca prostrata is a plant in the sunflower family native to Cape Province in South Africa. Common names include Prostrate Cape weed and Creeping Bear's-ear. It is listed as an invasive weed in California and Australia.

References

Arctotideae
Flora of South Africa